Gian Luca Mazzella (born in Rome) is an Italian executive consultant, former journalist, wine and food expert, documentarian.

He has been a consultant for various renowned realities within the wine sector, and sometimes also for other sectors as well as for European Television industry.

He also worked for European newspapers. and magazines  as editor, columnist or feature writer, sometimes under a pseudonym.

He conducted historical wine events.

References

External links
 http://archiviostorico.corriere.it/2011/novembre/05/Cesare_Barolo_gli_altri_festival_co_9_111105029.shtml
 http://www.indianwineacademy.com/item_5_404.aspx
 http://www.vdp.de/en/quality-guarantee/riesling/the-tasting/ 
 http://www.vdp.de/nc/en/press/press-detail/article/rueckblick-historische-internationale-silvanerprobe/?tx_ttnews%5bbackPid%5d=9&cHash=8fd2ba127e 

Living people
Wine critics
Italian journalists
Italian male journalists
Writers from Rome
Year of birth missing (living people)